Juhani Tapio Antero Kärkinen (28 October 1935 – 29 August 2019) was a Finnish ski jumper who won a gold medal in the large hill at the 1958 World Ski Championships. He placed eighth in the normal hill at the 1960 Winter Olympics. His elder brother Kalevi was also an international ski jumper.

References

1935 births
2019 deaths
People from Kotka
Finnish male ski jumpers
Ski jumpers at the 1960 Winter Olympics
FIS Nordic World Ski Championships medalists in ski jumping
Sportspeople from Kymenlaakso
20th-century Finnish people